Pētõr Damberg ((); March 9, 1909 Sīkrags – April 25, 1987) was a Livonian linguist, poet and teacher. He graduated from a teacher's school in Jelgava and worked as a Livonian language teacher. He worked on developing Livonian grammar, wrote several poems in Livonian and translated books into Livonian. His most important works were Livonian school books, which became the most common Livonian language books in use for teaching. After World War II he worked as a private teacher. He died on April 25, 1987 and was buried in a graveyard in Baltezers.

References

 Livones.lv: Pēteris Dambergs (Latvian)
 Marjo Mela and Lembit Valba: Latvian historiaa ja kulttuuria, Rozentāls-seura 2005,  (Finnish)

1909 births
1987 deaths
People from Talsi Municipality
People from Courland Governorate
Livonian people
Latvian writers
20th-century Latvian poets
Latvian male poets
20th-century male writers